Mathias Sandorf is an 1885 adventure book by French writer Jules Verne. It was first serialized in Le Temps in 1885,  and it was Verne's epic Mediterranean adventure. It employs many of the devices that had served well in his earlier novels: islands, cryptograms, surprise revelations of identity, technically advanced hardware and a solitary figure bent on revenge. Verne dedicated the novel to the memory of Alexandre Dumas, père, hoping to make Mathias Sandorf the Monte Cristo of Voyages Extraordinaires (The Extraordinary Voyages) series.

Overview
In Trieste, 1867, two petty criminals, Sarcany and Zirone, intercept a carrier pigeon. They find a ciphered message attached to its leg and uncover a plot to liberate Hungary from Habsburg-Austrian rule. The two meet with Silas Toronthal, a corrupt banker and form a plan to deliver the conspirators to the police in exchange for a rich reward. The three Hungarian conspirators, Count Mathias Sandorf, Stephen Bathory and Ladislas Zathmar (in their Hungarian form: Sándor Mátyás, Báthory István and Szatmári László, respectively) are arrested and sentenced to death. They plot an escape, but are recaptured and killed one by one.

Fifteen years later, the renowned physician Dr. Antekirtt (actually Sandorf who survived by faking his death) sets out to avenge his friends. Enlisting the aid of two French acrobats, Pescade and Matifou, he scours the Mediterranean in search of those who planned the betrayal. Rich beyond all imagination, wielding great power and master of an island fortress filled with advanced weaponry, Dr. Antekirtt will not rest until justice is done.

The Wanderer's Tale: An Adventure Subgenre
In the generation after Dumas, Jules Verne wrote a number of Wanderer adventures. Three of the most notable, Michael Strogoff, The Steam House (La Maison à vapeur) and Mathias Sandorf, are set in three of Europe's great Empires: the Russian, the British (in India), and the Austrian. Their plots and themes have a good deal in common, as Jean Yves Tadie points out. Each one is about the empire's political troubles, each features a pursuer who is himself pursued, each has a trio of characters at its centre and each grants minor importance (compared with other Verne books) to machinery.

(From Seven Types of Adventure: An Eniology of Major Genre by Martin Green Penn State Press).

Background on the novel
The fictional plot of Verne's book begins on May 18, 1867 - by which date preparations for the rising in Hungary are said to be almost complete. It is a matter of actual historical record - easily available to Verne in his research for the book - that on May 29, 1867, the Diet of Hungary  ratified the Austro-Hungarian Compromise of 1867, under which the Hungarians gained a very considerable autonomy but shelved their demand for complete independence from Austria.

Though the compromise is not explicitly mentioned in the book, it is clear that the aim of Sandorf and his fellow conspirators is to avert this ratification, seize control of Buda (Pest, Buda and Óbuda were unified in 1873) and other major Hungarian cities, and get the Diet to declare instead a complete Hungarian independence - gambling that  Austria, enfeebled by its recent defeat in the Austro-Prussian War, would have no choice but to accept this fait accompli. (If successful, such a move would have substantially changed later European history, up to the outbreak of World War I).

The conduct of the Austrian authorities, once the conspiracy is discovered, can also be seen against the same background: The Austrians move in complete secrecy to arrest, court-martial and swiftly execute the radical Hungarians, while cementing the deal with their more amenable compatriots in the glare of publicity.

Verne's readers in 1885 could know, even before reading of the police arresting Sandorf and his friends, that the conspiracy would fail, that the moderate Hungarians' compromise with Austria would go ahead and that in fact Hungarians would prove fairly content with it. 
 
Verne claimed that Sandorf was modeled on his publisher. Like Hetzel, a former exile, Sandorf has fervent patriotism and a high moral sense. Dr Antekirtt is a mixture of Hetzel and Bixio, one of the publisher's friends. Others see similarities with Hungarian freedom fighter Lajos Kossuth (who, like Sandorf, remained unreconciled to the compromise) and Austrian prince Ludwig Salvator.

The action moves from Trieste down the Adriatic coast, to Sicily and the shores of North Africa. "I wish my readers to learn everything they should know about the Mediterranean," Verne wrote Hetzel," which is why the action transports them to twenty different places" (Simon Vierne, Jules Verne, Paris Ballard 1986). Several of the settings come from Verne's own travels, a rescue during a storm off Malta and visits to Catania and Etna.

Verne researched the Italian landscape by rereading some of Stendhal's works notably Promenades in Rome and The Charterhouse of Parma. Verne may have first heard about the Foiba beneath Pisino castle in Charles Yriarte’s works Les Bords de l'Adriatique (The Ports of the Adriatic) - (Hachette, Paris 1878) and Trieste e l'Istria (Trieste and Istria) - (Hachette, Paris 1875). Yriatre described the old castle as well as his trip down into the gorge. He also mentioned an experiment by a young nobleman, Count Esdorff, to find the end of the underground river. Unfortunately the count's boat never made it out of the cave.

The first edition was dedicated to Alexandre Dumas, père. His son was so moved by the love expressed in the dedication that he wrote a letter to Verne which said 'I've been loving you for so long that I feel like your brother', and admitted that in literature Verne is Dumas' son more than he himself.

The steam yacht of doctor Antekirtt, Savarena, is a true portrait of Verne's own steam yacht which he bought from the eccentric millionaire marquis de Préaulx for 60,000 F.

Film, TV or theatrical adaptations

Mathias Sandorf was performed as a five-act play in Paris in the 1880s. It even played the Boston theatre in the fall of 1888 as well as at Niblo's Garden in New York in October 1888.

There have also been three screen adaptations of Mathias Sandorf. The first Mathias Sandorf was made in 1921 and directed by Henri Fescourt. It starred Yvette Andréyor, Romuald Joubé, Jean Toulout. During the 1920s Fescourt was one of the most successful directors working for Cineroman, and Mathias Sandorf, Les Gransa and Mandarin were among his most popular works.

In 1963 Georges Lampin directed another version Mathias Sandorf starring Louis Jourdan, Francisco Rabal, Renaud Mary and Serena Vergano.

The most recent version was a Television  miniseries made for French television in 1979. Directed by Jean-Pierre Decourt it starred Hungarian actor Istvan Bujtor as Mathias Sandorf, Ivan Desny as Zathmar, and also Amadeus August, Claude Giraud, Monika Peitsch, Sissy Höfferer and Jacques Breuer.

References

External links

Read Chapter 1 of the classic edition reissued by ROH Press
Click to read the first two chapters of Ed Brumgach's new 2005 English translation.
Click to read the original French version.
Mathias Sandorf international list of first editions.
Mathias Sandorf Article and little known facts.

1885 French novels
Novels by Jules Verne
Novels set in Hungary
Novels set in Croatia
French novels adapted into films
French novels adapted into television shows
Fiction set in 1867
Novels set in the 1860s